Van Helsing: The London Assignment is a 2004 action horror animated short film by Universal Studios Home Video. It features the voices of Hugh Jackman, Tress MacNeille, Robbie Coltrane and David Wenham. The London Assignment is an animated prequel to the 2004 motion picture Van Helsing (released the same year). It tells of the events before the film.

Plot
Monster hunter Gabriel Van Helsing and friar Carl travel to London to investigate a series of horrific, and decidedly supernatural murders, being committed by the mad scientist Dr. Jekyll, in the form of his evil alter-ego, Mr. Hyde. When tracing Hyde to his underground fortress, Van Helsing and Carl find a young woman who claims to be Queen Victoria, and they discover that Dr. Jekyll is in love with the Queen. In order to keep her young and thus immortal, she has been given a potion by Dr. Jekyll that turns her into a young woman for one night. In order to create the potion which causes the transformations, Dr. Jekyll needs the drained souls of his freshly killed victims and thus the killings will never stop.

Dr. Jekyll then kidnaps Victoria, using the Golden Jubilee Balloon to escape. Van Helsing uses his grappling gun to follow the balloon, then proceeds to board it. In the balloon, Dr. Jekyll becomes Mr. Hyde to kill Van Helsing and crashes the balloon in the process. While fighting on the in-construction Tower Bridge, Mr. Hyde is shot through the arm but manages to escape. Upon returning Victoria to Buckingham Palace, Van Helsing says that daybreak will break the enchantment, returning her to her real age.

To reward him, Victoria kisses him, at the precise moment of daybreak, causing her old self to slap him and call for guards. Van Helsing sends word back to Vatican City about what has happened while he tracks Jekyll to Paris.

Voice cast
 Hugh Jackman as Gabriel Van Helsing
 Tress MacNeille as Queen Victoria
 Tara Strong as Young Victoria
 Dwight Schultz as Dr. Henry Jekyll / Jack the Ripper
 Robbie Coltrane as Edward Hyde / Jack the Ripper
 David Wenham as Friar Carl
 Grey DeLisle as the First Victim
 Tress MacNeille as the Second Victim
 John DiMaggio as Coachman
 Scott Mosenson as Palace Guard
 Alun Armstrong as Cardinal Jinette
 Roger Jackson as Drunken Gentleman
 Julia Fletcher as Lady-in-Waiting

References

External links

 

2004 animated films
2004 direct-to-video films
2004 films
2004 horror films
2000s action horror films
2000s American animated films
2000s animated short films
American adult animated films
American action horror films
Direct-to-video action films
Direct-to-video fantasy films
Direct-to-video horror films
Direct-to-video prequel films
Dr. Jekyll and Mr. Hyde films
Films about Jack the Ripper
Films set in 1888
Animated films set in London
Universal Pictures direct-to-video animated films
Universal Animation Studios animated films
Universal Pictures direct-to-video films
Van Helsing (Universal Pictures franchise)
2000s English-language films
American prequel films